David Neumann is an American choreographer, dancer, and actor. He is known for his magnetic energy and his charismatic performances. He is a 2019 Tony nominated choreographer for Hadestown

Born in 1965 in Paris, Neumann grew up in South Brunswick, New Jersey, and graduated from South Brunswick High School in 1983. He was infatuated with movement from a young age and had incredible energy as a child. He describes the particular problems this posed for his parents saying that they devised a “weird bungee cord kind of harness thing, so whenever I got a good burst of speed, I would always return to where I started. I was very, very active as a kid.” 

Neumann eventually used this energy into dance. He was part of his high school's dance company and experimented with popular dance forms in clubs and informal performance spaces. He eventually went on to perform with the late club legend Willi Ninja, well known for his appearance in the film Paris is Burning.

Neumann went on to study theater at the State University of New York at Purchase, while continuing to dance. He first started working with Doug Elkins during that time. He went on to be a founding member of the Doug Elkins Dance Company and he worked with them for eight years.

After his graduation in 1988 Neumann continued dancing and worked with the Doug Elkins Dance Company, with whom he toured nationally and internationally. Neumann has continued to work within the dance field while also expanding to include work in theatre, opera and film. He has worked with directors such as Hal Hartley, Laurie Anderson, Robert Woodruff, Lee Breuer, Peter Sellars, JoAnn Akalaitis, Chris Bayes, Mark Wing-Davey, Daniel Sullivan, Les Waters and Molly Smith.

Neumann has received various critical accolades for his work both as a dance and as a choreographer. Notably he received a Bessie award in 1991 for his performance and in 1998 for his choreography.

Neumann founded his own company called the advanced beginner group in 2001. His work has been supported by various grants including the Foundation for Contemporary Arts Grants to Artists award (2011), 2009 Creative Capital Award, a 2007 Meet the Composer Grant, a 2004 Rockefeller Foundation Multi-Arts Production grant and a 1993 Princess Grace Fellowship in Theater. This group has received various commissions and most recently appeared at Jacob's Pillow Dance Festival.

Neumann is married to singer/actor Erica Sweany.

Notes 

Modern dancers
American choreographers
Living people
Year of birth missing (living people)
People from South Brunswick, New Jersey
South Brunswick High School (New Jersey) alumni
State University of New York at Purchase alumni